Seif El-Deraa (born 19 September 1998) is an Egyptian handball player. He competed in the 2020 Summer Olympics. He plays for Zamalek SC (handball)

His brother, Yehia, represented Egypt in handball at the 2016 Summer Olympics.

References

1998 births
Living people
Sportspeople from Cairo
Handball players at the 2020 Summer Olympics
Egyptian male handball players
Olympic handball players of Egypt
African Games silver medalists for Egypt
African Games medalists in handball
Competitors at the 2019 African Games
Competitors at the 2022 Mediterranean Games
Mediterranean Games silver medalists for Egypt
Mediterranean Games medalists in handball
21st-century Egyptian people